Champagne for One is a Nero Wolfe detective novel by Rex Stout, first published by the Viking Press in 1958.
The back matter of the 1995 Bantam edition of this book includes an exchange of correspondence between Stout and his editor at Viking Press, Marshall Best. A letter from Stout to Best, dated July 1958, shows that Stout suggested as a title both "Champagne for One" and also "Champagne for Faith Usher." Best's reply states that Viking was quite satisfied with "Champagne for One."

Plot introduction

Archie Goodwin sits in for a friend at a charity dinner dance for unwed mothers, and one of the guests drops dead on the dance floor.

Plot summary
Archie Goodwin receives a phone call from an acquaintance, Austin "Dinky" Byne, asking for a favour. Byne routinely acts as a chaperone for an annual dinner hosted by his aunt, Louise Grantham Robilotti, which is given in honour of four young unwed mothers living at Grantham House, a charity supported by her late husband. Byne claims to have a cold and is unable to attend; although skeptical, Archie agrees to stand in for him, despite Mrs. Robilotti's being a former client of Nero Wolfe's who bears him a personal dislike. During the dinner, Archie learns from one of the unwed mothers that another, Faith Usher, has a bottle of cyanide in her purse; Faith has been suffering from depression, and her friend fears that she might attempt suicide. Archie promises to watch over her, but towards the end of the evening Faith collapses and dies from cyanide poisoning after drinking a glass of champagne.

Alone of the guests, Archie maintains that Faith Usher did not commit suicide, claiming that he observed her constantly throughout the evening and that she never had an opportunity to pour the cyanide from her bottle into her glass. Although the authorities and the other guests pressure Archie into changing his story, Nero Wolfe believes him and decides to settle the matter by solving the case himself. He is given further incentive to do so when Edwin Laidlaw, another of the chaperones, approaches him to hire his services; Laidlaw is the father of Faith Usher's child after a brief affair they had the previous year and, ashamed of his conduct, is desperate that his secret is not revealed.

Although Wolfe's investigation begins unpromisingly, he becomes convinced that his suspicions are correct when the police receive an anonymous tip revealing Laidlaw's secret. Although the police are skeptical due to the tip's anonymous nature, it suggests to Wolfe that someone else knows Laidlaw's secret and has become agitated by the ongoing investigation. His investigations begin to focus on both Faith Usher's estranged mother Elaine, herself an unwed mother, and Dinky Byne, whose false reasons for canceling on the party look increasingly suspect given the events. He assigns Saul Panzer and Archie to investigate the two respectively, leading to a break in the case when both Archie and Saul tail their respective targets to the same location: a nightclub where Elaine Usher and Dinky Byne are meeting with each other.

When confronted by Wolfe, both Byne and Elaine Usher attempt to lie their way out of the situation, but their stories are inconsistent. Byne admits that he knew that Laidlaw was the father of Faith Usher's child, and claims that he had them both invited to the dinner without their knowledge as a spiteful prank. During their conversation, however, Orrie Cather infiltrates Byne's apartment and discovers a letter revealing that Mrs. Robilotti's deceased first husband, Albert Grantham, was the father of Faith Usher. This, coupled with some unwittingly suggestive comments from Byne, leads Wolfe to identify the murderer. 

Summoning the guests to his office, he has them reenact the circumstances under which Faith Usher received the poisoned champagne multiple times. This demonstrates that Mrs. Robilotti's son Cecil, who gave Faith the poisoned champagne, had a routine way of handing over a glass that someone who knew his habits would be able to predict. He accuses Mrs. Robilotti of poisoning Faith Usher; Byne was blackmailing her with the knowledge that her former husband was Faith's father and invited Faith to the dinner as a threat. Mrs. Robilotti murdered Faith to conceal the secret and out of resentment over her husband's affair and, learning that she was in the habit of carrying cyanide, acquired some from another source to make it look like a suicide. Archie is vindicated, and Mrs. Robilotti is taken into custody.

Themes

Changing sexual mores
The book reflects the transitional situation of American sexual mores at the time of writing, on the verge of the sexual revolution of the 1960s. Unwed mothers are a major issue in the book, and constitute a large part of its cast of characters. They are presented sympathetically, but still unwed motherhood is presented as "a problem" for which they need to be helped. The preferred solution is to provide a friendly and supportive environment during pregnancy and to have the baby given over to adoption immediately upon birth. The option of the unwed mother keeping and raising her child is presented as a far more problematic idea. Indeed—as it ultimately turns out—it has much to do with the circumstances that led to the murder being investigated.

In chapter 2 Archie Goodwin is rather shocked to discover that one of the young women, Rose Tuttle, had given birth outside marriage not once but twice. He recounts at length his moral dilemma at hearing this: "I had on my shoulders the responsibility for the moral and social position of the community, at least in part (...). To list my objections would have been fine if I had been ordained, but I hadn't, and anyway she had certainly heard these objections before and hadn't been impressed. (...) While it was none of my business if she kept on having babies, I absolutely wasn't going to encourage her."

On the other hand, in chapter 6 Archie is surprised to learn that Edwin Laidlaw seriously expects his bride-to-be to remain a virgin until their wedding night. His reaction to this is scathing: "Laidlaw turned out to have an old-fashioned streak (...) an old fogey at thirty-one."

The unfamiliar word
In most Nero Wolfe novels and novellas, there is at least one unfamiliar word, usually spoken by Wolfe. Champagne for One contains but one example, apart from the legalese respondeat superior found in Chapter 9. (In Chapter 2 the reader is also treated to a discussion of the derivation of protocol from the Greek proto, "first," and kollon, "glue".)

On page 202 of the 1996 Bantam edition, in Chapter 16, Wolfe says, "You have trimmed long enough." The word "trimmed" is not itself unfamiliar, but the usage may be.

Cast
Nero Wolfe – the private investigator
Archie Goodwin – Wolfe's assistant (and the narrator of all Wolfe stories)
Mr. and Mrs. Robert Robilotti – a wealthy heiress who inherited the fortune of her first husband, Mr. Grantham, and her current husband
Faith Usher, Helen Yarmis, Rose Tuttle, and Ethel Varr – the four unwed-mother guests at a dinner party given by Mrs. Robilotti
Elaine Usher – Faith's estranged mother
Austin "Dinky" Byne – Mrs. Robilotti's nephew
Edwin Laidlaw – a publisher who is terrified that his prior relationship with Faith Usher will be exposed by the investigation into her death
Cecil and Celia Grantham – Mrs. Robilotti's twin son and daughter from her first marriage
Paul Schuster and Beverly Kent – along with Edwin Laidlaw and Archie Goodwin, dinner partners for the young women at the party
Inspector Cramer and Sergeant Purley Stebbins – Manhattan homicide
Saul Panzer, Fred Durkin, and Orrie Cather – freelance detectives often employed by Wolfe

Reviews and commentary
 Jacques Barzun and Wendell Hertig Taylor, A Catalogue of Crime – "Archie and Nero shine, once again, on the question: Who slipped the cyanide into the glass of the girl attending the unwed mothers' annual party at the house of their benefactress?  Two small queries: would the dead philanthropist write the odd letter of gift that provides no better control of large funds than someone's probity? And how was the poison actually administered? One can't buy ready-mixed KCN."
 Nancy Pearl, Book Lust – "When Stout is on top of his game, which is most of the time, his diabolically clever plotting and his storytelling ability exceed that of any other mystery writer you can name, including Agatha Christie, who invented her own eccentric genius detective Hercule Poirot. Although in the years since Stout's death I find myself going back and rereading his entire oeuvre every year or two, I return with particular pleasure to these five novels: The Doorbell Rang; Plot It Yourself; Murder by the Book; Champagne for One; and Gambit."

Adaptations

A Nero Wolfe Mystery (A&E Network)
Lee Goldberg and William Rabkin adapted Champagne for One for the second episode of the A&E TV series A Nero Wolfe Mystery (2001–2002), a Jaffe/Braunstein Films coproduction with the A&E Network. The second of four Nero Wolfe episodes directed by executive producer and star Timothy Hutton, "Champagne for One" made its debut in two one-hour episodes airing April 29 and May 6, 2001, on A&E.

Timothy Hutton is Archie Goodwin; Maury Chaykin is Nero Wolfe. Other members of the cast (in credits order) are Bill Smitrovich (Inspector Cramer), Colin Fox (Fritz Brenner), James Tolkan (Mr. Hackett). Marian Seldes (Louise Grantham Robilotti), Kari Matchett (Celia Grantham), Conrad Dunn (Saul Panzer), Nicky Guadagni (Elaine Usher), Kathryn Zenna (Helen Yarmis), Alex Poch-Goldin (Edwin Laidlaw), Robert Bockstael (Paul Schuster), R.D. Reid (Sergeant Purley Stebbins), Christine Brubaker (Rose Tuttle), Steve Cumyn (Cecil Grantham), Boyd Banks (Austin "Dinky" Byne), David Schurmann (Robert Robilotti), Michael Rhoades (Beverly Kent), Janine Theriault (Ethel Varr) and Patricia Zentilli (Faith Usher).

The episode's signature waltz is Jazz Suite No. 2 (Suite for Promenade Orchestra), VI — Waltz 2, by Dmitri Shostakovich, recorded by the Royal Concertgebouw Orchestra conducted by Riccardo Chailly. The soundtrack also includes music by Luigi Boccherini, Rick Krive and Antonio Vivaldi.

In North America, A Nero Wolfe Mystery is available on Region 1 DVD from A&E Home Video. "Champagne for One" is divided into two parts as originally broadcast on A&E.

"Champagne for One" is one of the Nero Wolfe episodes released on Region 4 DVD in Australia under license by FremantleMedia Enterprises. Nero Wolfe — Collection One (2008) presents "Champagne for One" as a 90-minute film with a single set of titles and credits. In 2009 the film was released on Region 2 DVD in the Netherlands, by Just Entertainment.

All three DVD releases present "Champagne for One" in 4:3 pan and scan rather than its 16:9 aspect ratio for widescreen viewing.

Nero Wolfe (Radiotelevisione italiana S.p.A.) 
Grazia Giardiello adapted Champagne for One for the second episode of the RAI TV series Nero Wolfe (Italy 2012), starring Francesco Pannofino as Nero Wolfe and Pietro Sermonti as Archie Goodwin. Set in 1959 in Rome, where Wolfe and Archie reside after leaving the United States, the series was produced by Casanova Multimedia and Rai Fiction and directed by Riccardo Donna. "Champagne per uno" made its debut April 12, 2012.

Publication history
1958, New York: The Viking Press, November 24, 1958, hardcover
In his limited-edition pamphlet, Collecting Mystery Fiction #10, Rex Stout's Nero Wolfe Part II, Otto Penzler describes the first edition of Champagne for One: "Black cloth, front cover and spine printed with purple; rear cover blank. Issued in a mainly black dust wrapper."
In April 2006, Firsts: The Book Collector's Magazine estimated that the first edition of Champagne for One had a value of between $200 and $350. The estimate is for a copy in very good to fine condition in a like dustjacket.
1958, London, Ontario: Macmillan, 1958
1959, New York: Viking (Mystery Guild), January 1959, hardcover
The far less valuable Viking book club edition may be distinguished from the first edition in three ways:
 The dust jacket has "Book Club Edition" printed on the inside front flap, and the price is absent (first editions may be price clipped if they were given as gifts).
 Book club editions are sometimes thinner and always taller (usually a quarter of an inch) than first editions.
 Book club editions are bound in cardboard, and first editions are bound in cloth (or have at least a cloth spine).
1959, London: Collins Crime Club, September 7, 1959, hardcover
1960, New York: Bantam #A2023, April 1960, paperback
1961, London: Fontana, 1961, paperback
1978, London: Penguin, 1978, paperback
1992, London: Scribners , 1992, hardcover
1996, New York: Bantam Crimeline , 1996, paperback, Rex Stout Library edition with introduction by Lena Horne
1998, Canada, Durkin Hayes Publishing, DH Audio   January 1998, audio cassette (unabridged, read by Saul Rubinek)
2006, Auburn, California: The Audio Partners Publishing Corp., Mystery Masters  March 28, 2006, audio CD (unabridged, read by Michael Prichard)
2009, New York: Bantam Dell Publishing Group (with Too Many Cooks)  April 28, 2009, trade paperback
2010, New York: Bantam Crimeline  July 21, 2010, e-book

Notes

References

External links

 A Nero Wolfe Mystery — "Champagne for One" at The Wolfe Pack, official site of the Nero Wolfe Society
 Script (PDF) for "Champagne for One," written by Lee Goldberg and William Rabkin, at the official site of Lee Goldberg

1958 American novels
Nero Wolfe novels by Rex Stout
Viking Press books
American novels adapted into films